White sausage may refer to:
Weisswurst, type of Bavarian sausage
Boudin blanc, type of French and Cajun sausage